Harry Norris (12 June 1888 – 15 December 1966) was an Australian architect, one of the more prolific and successful in Melbourne in the interwar period, best known for his 1930s Art Deco commercial work in the Melbourne central business district.

His designs were informed by his regular overseas trips, especially to the United States, which he visited at least every 18 months from perhaps the late 1920s; and he was one of the first architects to introduce the Art Deco style to major commercial projects.

He had a strong and long relationship with the wealthy Nicholas family, designing not only the Nicholas Building, but the Aspro factory in South Melbourne, the spectacular mansion Burnham Beeches in the Dandenong Ranges for Alfred Nicholas, and various additions and alterations to Wesley College following a bequest from the family. He also had a long relationship with George Coles, designing branches of their eponymous Coles Stores from the late 1920s, numerous matching Art Deco branches in the 1930s, and some of their earliest supermarkets in the 1950s, as well as a country house for E. B. Coles in 1938. He refused membership of the RVIA for many years until finally joining on the 21 February 1946. Harry Norris retired on his 78th birthday in June 1966 and died six months later.

Notable Projects

Nicholas Building

Address: 27-41 Swanston Street, Melbourne

Date of construction:  1925–26, 1939–40 (extension)

The Nicholas Building is one of the most distinctive interwar office blocks in Melbourne. The facade is an essay in the Commercial Palazzo or Stripped Classical on a grand scale, with classical elements such as tall ionic pilasters and Doric columns and a wide cornice, all executed in architectural terra cotta, known in Australia as faience. The Cathedral Arcade is located on the ground floor and its glazed leadlight barrel vaulted ceiling is a main feature of the building.  Norris had his architecture practice here from 1926 until moving to 136 Jolimont Road, East Melbourne in the 1950s. The Nicholas Building was originally used as offices and retail, and as of the 2010s is known for specialist retail and creative industries.

G.J. Coles Building
Address: 298-304 Bourke Street, Melbourne

Date of construction: 1929–30, 1938-40 (extension), 1984 Bates Smart McCutcheon (conversion to David Jones)

Builder: Clements Langford

Engineer: Clive Steele

The building is noted for its use of colorful Jazz Moderne detailing, the unusual mauve colour of the  faience facade and an overall verticality created by the use of prominent vertical piers, a form known locally as "Commercial Gothic". It was one of the first large scale examples of Art Deco design in Melbourne both inside and out, opening in March 1930 to expectant crowds.

Block Court

Address:  288-292 Collins Street, Melbourne

Date of construction:1929-30

Block Court was a remodelling project, introducing a shopping arcade to the ground floor of an older building (the 1890 Athenaeum Club, connecting Collins Street with the Block Arcade. Block Court is noted for its extensive use of Art Deco detailing, such as the zigzag decoration to the copper shop window frames, patterned stained glass highlight windows, patterned multi-colour terrazzo flooring and elaborate ceiling decoration with stepped geometric shapes and floral motifs. Opening in October 1930, it was one of the earliest notable examples of Art Deco design in Melbourne (preceded by Norris's Coles Store), and remains the most ornate Art Deco interior in the city.
Burnham Beeches

Address : Sherbrooke Road, Sassafras

Date of construction : 1931–33

A large country house built for Alfred Nicholas, it is the most outstanding mansion in the Art Deco style Victoria. Built over three levels, set in extensive landscaped grounds, it included numerous bedrooms, living spaces, sunrooms and a rooftop deck, with large windows overlooking the hillside. The expression is in a white horizontal Streamlined Moderne mode, with decorative Jazz Moderne detailing including motifs of koalas and possums in moulded relief panels.

Mitchell House

Address: 325-362 Lonsdale Street, Melbourne

Date of construction: 1937

Mitchell House is located at the corner of Elizabeth Street and Lonsdale Street. The building is a fine example of Streamline Moderne, featuring horizontal bands of windows wrapping around the curved corner, broken by a contrasting vertical element topped by the gold lettering of the building's name.

Selected projects
Tattersall's Club premises (now Curtin House), 248–258 Swanston Street, Melbourne, 1922
Deva House, 327 Bourke Street, Melbourne, 1924
Nicholas Building, 27-41 Swanston Street, Melbourne, 1926
Majorca Building, 258-260 Flinders Lane, 1929
Former Kellow Falkiner Showrooms, 375-379 St Kilda Road, South Yarra, 1928 (altered)
Block Court Arcade, 288–292 Collins Street, 1930
G.J.Coles Stores, 299–307 Bourke Street, Melbourne, 1928–1930
Northcote Town Hall auditorium and lobby refurbishment, 197–201 High Street, Northcote, 1930
Burnham Beeches, Sherbrooke Road, Sassafras, 1931–33
Moonya, 9 Lakeside Drive, Country Club Estate, Emerald, c1937
Silver Birches, 1 Mary St, Country Club Estate, Emerald, c1937
Melford Motors Showroom, 615 Elizabeth Street, North Melbourne, 1937
Mission to Seamen, 1 Beach Road, Port Melbourne, 1937 (dem c1992)
Former Capitol Bakeries, 625 Chapel Street, 1937 (dem 2017)
Hendra, 11 Williams Rd, Mount Eliza, 1938
Northern Bakery (later Tip Top), 170 Edward Street, Brunswick East, 1940 (altered)
Coles Store, Ivanhoe, 115–117 Upper Heidelberg Road, Ivanhoe, 1940
Nicholas Hall, 148 Lonsdale Street, Melbourne, 1940
Ivanhoe Grammar School, The Ridgeway, Ivanhoe, 1954
Fowlers Vacola Manufacturing Factory, 275 Burwood Road, Hawthorn, 1955 (now The Works homewares store)
Australian and New Zealand Bank, 224-236 Queen Street, Melbourne, 1958 (altered)
Hotel Windsor, Spring Street (north extension), 1961
Kodak Factory (1950s–60s) and administration building (1964) (dem 2011).

References

Further reading

Freeland, J. M. (1968) Architecture In Australia - A History. Penguin Books.
Goad, P & Plaxe, K. (2002) A Short History of Melbourne Architecture. Pesaro Publishing.
Goad, P. (1999) Melbourne Architecture. The Watermark Press.
Grow, R. (2009) Melbourne Art Deco. Ripe Off The Press.

1888 births
1966 deaths
Architects from Melbourne